Darya Stanislavovna Besedina (born 22 July 1988) is a Russian politician. She's a deputy of the Moscow City Duma.

Biography
She was born in Khimki, Moscow Oblast, RSFSR. Graduated from the MArchI in 2014.

Political life
In 2019, Besedina was elected to the Moscow City Duma in the 8th single-mandate constituency (the districts Airport, Voykovsky, Koptevo, Sokol), receiving 14911 votes (36.6%). Besedina is a member of the commissions for education, environmental, urban management and housing policy. She was supported by Alexei Navalny's "Smart Voting" system and was a member of the United Democratic Party "Yabloko".

Electoral history

References

1988 births
21st-century Russian women politicians
Living people
Deputies of Moscow City Duma
Russian activists against the 2022 Russian invasion of Ukraine
Yabloko politicians